Pediasia browerella is a moth in the family Crambidae. It was described by Alexander Barrett Klots in 1942. It is found in North America, where it has been recorded from Colorado, Maine, Manitoba and Nunavut.

The wingspan is about 22 mm. Adults are on wing from June to July.

References

Crambini
Moths described in 1942
Moths of North America